John Stevens (1824-1881) was an American architect who practiced in Boston, Massachusetts. He was known for ecclesiastical design, and designed churches and other buildings across New England.

Life and career
John Stevens was born in 1824. His early life is unknown, and he established himself as an architect in Boston in 1850. After several years primarily designing schools and private residences, he began receiving commissions for churches by the end of the 1850s. He built these churches, generally in the Romanesque Revival style, in Massachusetts, Maine, Vermont, and Rhode Island. From 1860 to 1862 he employed Archimedes Russell, who would later become a prominent architect in Syracuse, New York. In 1869 he was briefly associated with S. F. Pratt, at which time he was working on buildings at Oak Bluffs. He remained in Massachusetts until 1879, when he established a partnership with his son, J. Walter Stevens, and moved west to St. Paul, Minnesota. John Stevens & Son operated until April 14, 1881, when Stevens died while on a visit to Worcester, Massachusetts.

Legacy
Stevens designed a great many churches. His Baptist church in Saint John, New Brunswick, completed in 1878, was said to have been his 113th. Many of his churches were built on only three basic models, which he relied on throughout his career. His contemporaries criticized him for this repetitiveness. In 1878, an anonymous writer going by "Verax" wrote in regard to his St. John church: "and as the 'outline and general features are after the Byzantine period' we may expect something similar to Mr. Stevens's previous works, which may be seen in almost every city from Calais to Lynn."

At least six of his works have been listed individually on the National Register of Historic Places, and several more contribute to listed historic districts.

Architectural works

References

1824 births
1881 deaths
Architects from Boston
Architects from Saint Paul, Minnesota
People from Worcester, Massachusetts